The Washington State Historical Society is the historical society of the U.S. state of Washington. Based in Tacoma, it is a 501(c)(3) nonprofit and is a trustee agency of the state. It was founded in 1891.

The board of trustees of the society includes the Governor of Washington, Secretary of State of Washington, and Washington Superintendent of Public Instruction, and four members of the Washington State Legislature.

The society owns and operates the Washington State History Museum. The society's official journal is Columbia: The Magazine of Northwest History. In 2016, the publication received a Leadership in History Award of Merit from the American Association for State and Local History.

References

External links
The Washington State Historical Society's main page

Charities based in Washington (state)
History of Washington (state)
State historical societies of the United States